Delias belisama is a butterfly in the family Pieridae. It was described by Pieter Cramer in 1779. It is found in the Indomalayan realm.

The wingspan is about 74–84 mm.

Subspecies
D. b. belisama (western and central Java)
D. b. glauce (Butler, 1865) (Sumatra)
D. b. nakula Grose-Smith & Kirby, 1889 (eastern Java)
D. b. balina Fruhstorfer, 1908 (Bali)

References

External links
Delias at Markku Savela's Lepidoptera and Some Other Life Forms

belisama
Butterflies described in 1779